James Forster may refer to:

 James William Forster (1784–1861), Archdeacon of Aghadoe
 James Forster (poison pen letter writer) (1933–2017), English academic and criminal